The 2022 Nigeria Invitational Women's T20I Tournament was a women's T20I cricket (WT20I) tournament that was held in Nigeria from 28 March to 3 April 2022. The venue for all of the matches was the Tafawa Balewa Square Cricket Oval in Lagos. Along with the hosts Nigeria, the tournament featured the national teams of Gambia, Ghana, Rwanda and Sierra Leone. Cameroon were also originally scheduled to take part.

As the two highest ranked sides in the tournament, Nigeria and Rwanda were seeded in the draw. Originally, Nigeria were placed in group A with Ghana and Gambia, while Rwanda were placed in  group B with Sierra Leone and Cameroon. However, Cameroon withdrew from the tournament and the format was changed to a round-robin followed by a third-place play-off and a final.

Nigeria beat Rwanda by three runs to finish top of the round-robin stage  after both sides had won their first three matches. However, the following day, the Rwandans defeated Nigeria by 53 runs in the final to win the tournament.

Squads

The Nigeria Cricket Federation invited 36 women to a training camp in Benin City ahead of the tournament. On 10 March 2022, the squad was reduced to 18 players for the final stage of the training camp.

Round-robin

Points table

 Advanced to the final
 Advanced to the third-place play-off

Fixtures

Third-place play-off

Final

References

External links
 Series home at ESPN Cricinfo

2022 in women's cricket
Associate international cricket competitions in 2021–22
Nigeria Invitational Women's T20I Tournament
Nigeria Invitational Women's T20I Tournament